Yu Shanwen (born 9 August 2000) is a Chinese footballer who plays for Qingdao Kangtine, on loan from Guangzhou.

Club career
In 2018, Yu joined Japanese third division side Iwate Grulla Morioka.

Yu joined Qingdao Kangtine on loan for the 2020 and 2021 seasons from Guangzhou.

Career statistics

.

Club

References

2000 births
Living people
Chinese footballers
China youth international footballers
Chinese expatriate footballers
Association football forwards
China League Two players
Villarreal CF players
Hebei F.C. players
Iwate Grulla Morioka players
Guangzhou F.C. players
Chinese expatriate sportspeople in Spain
Expatriate footballers in Spain
Chinese expatriate sportspeople in Japan
Expatriate footballers in Japan